Neuropeltis is a genus of flowering plants belonging to the family Convolvulaceae.

Its native range is Western Tropical Africa to Angola, India to Southern Central China and Western Malesia.

Species:

Neuropeltis acuminata 
Neuropeltis aenea 
Neuropeltis alnifolia 
Neuropeltis eladii 
Neuropeltis incompta 
Neuropeltis indochinensis 
Neuropeltis laxiflora 
Neuropeltis maingayi 
Neuropeltis malabarica 
Neuropeltis occidentalis 
Neuropeltis prevosteoides 
Neuropeltis pseudovelutina 
Neuropeltis racemosa 
Neuropeltis velutina

References

Convolvulaceae
Convolvulaceae genera